The National Federation of Trade, Hotels and Tourism (FECOHT) was a trade union representing hospitality and retail workers in Spain.

The union was established in October 1996, when the National Federation of Commerce merged with the National Federation of Hotel and Tourism Workers.  Like both its predecessors, it affiliated to the Workers' Commissions.  On formation, it had 43,340 members.  On 15 July 2014, it merged with the Federation of Financial and Administrative Services, to form the new Federation of Services.

References

Hospitality industry trade unions
Retail trade unions
Trade unions established in 1996
Trade unions disestablished in 2014
Trade unions in Spain